Mirko Uhlig (born 22 June 1981 in Aachen, Germany) is a German artist in the field of contemporary experimental music.

Music
He first appeared with surreal sound collages and musique concrète-techniques under the moniker Aalfang Mit Pferdekopf (catching eels with a horse's head) around 2004. After releasing four albums and some EPs (on Aal, Einzeleinheit, Taalem, Mystery Sea and Drone Records) Uhlig decided to release his now much more minimalistic and serene works under a less delusive name.

Uhlig's output is inspired by artists such as La Monte Young, early Tangerine Dream, Brian Eno, Nurse With Wound, David Lynch, William Basinski and current Hafler Trio.

“Uhlig plays a form of drone music that is highly refreshing. He creates something that is beyond the ordinary! For me Mirko Uhlig is one of the better and unfortunately lesser known drone masters of Germany.” (Vital Weekly)

"Uhlig is one of the few ones able to cut the oneiric bliss of his creations right in the moment of maximum ecstasy." (Touching Extremes)

Beside his solo work Mirko Uhlig runs the Ex Ovo label for "drone music and dulcet atmospheres", founded the Suneaters (band) (together with Tobias Fischer of tokafi magazine) and worked with several artists, such as Dronæment, Emerge (band), Rostiges Riesenrad and Balog.

Discography
(only recordings under his own name)

2006 VIVMMI (Album on Ex Ovo)
2006 A Total Black Morning With Machines At Sleep (contribution to Mute Scribbles)
2007 Storm: Outside Calm Tamed (EP on Aal)
2007 The Rabbit's Logbook (EP on Field Muzick)
2007 Farewell Fields (with Dronæment, on Nextera)

Sources cited
 Vital Weekly
 Touching Extremes
 Nextera artist page

References

External links
 Official Website
 Interview at www.tokafi.com
 Official MySpace Page
 http://www.exovo.org

1981 births
Living people
Ambient musicians
German electronic musicians
People from Aachen
German experimental musicians